Derelict is a 1930 American pre-Code adventure film directed by Rowland V. Lee and written by Grover Jones and William Slavens McNutt. The film stars George Bancroft, Jessie Royce Landis and William "Stage" Boyd. The film was released on November 22, 1930, by Paramount Pictures.

Cast
George Bancroft as Bill Rafferty
Jessie Royce Landis as Helen Lorber
William "Stage" Boyd as Jed Graves
Donald Stuart as Fin Thomson
Wade Boteler as Captain Gregg
Paul Porcasi as Masoni
Brooks Benedict as McFall

References

External links

1930 films
1930 adventure films
American adventure films
American black-and-white films
Films directed by Rowland V. Lee
Paramount Pictures films
Seafaring films
Films scored by Karl Hajos
1930s English-language films
1930s American films
English-language adventure films